Events in the year 1864 in Argentina.

Incumbents
 President: Bartolomé Mitre
 Vice President: Marcos Paz

Governors
 Buenos Aires Province: Mariano Saavedra
 Cordoba: Roque Ferreyra (starting month unknown)
 Mendoza Province: Carlos González
 Santa Fe Province: Patricio Cullen

Vice Governors
Buenos Aires Province: vacant

Events
 10 August – Uruguayan War: War breaks out between Brazil and Uruguay, despite negotiations involving Argentine Foreign Minister Rufino de Elizalde.
 25 October – establishment of General Las Heras Partido
 13 December – Paraguayan War: Paraguay declares war on Brazil; war with Argentina follows three months later.
 The classic aperitif Hesperidina is invented by American immigrant Melville Sewell Bagley in Buenos Aires.

Deaths
 30 October – Jonas Coe ("Comodoro Juan Coe"), US naval commander and supporter of Juan Manuel de Rosas (born 1805).

References

 
1860s in Argentina
History of Argentina (1852–1880)
Years of the 19th century in Argentina